Jews of the Bilad al-Sudan describes West African Jewish communities which were connected to known Jewish communities which were expelled from the Middle East, North Africa, or Spain and Portugal and migrated to West Africa. Various historical records state that at one time, they were present in the Ghana, Mali, and Songhai empires, which was then called the Bilad as-Sudan a name which is derived from the Arabic term which means Land of the Blacks. In later years Jews who were expelled from Spain, Portugal and Morocco, and who migrated to West Africa, formed communities off the coast of Senegal as well as on the Islands of Cape Verde.  These Jewish communities continued to exist for hundreds of years but eventually disappeared as a result of changing social conditions, persecution, migration, and assimilation.

Early history 
According to most accounts, the earliest Jewish settlements in Africa were in places such as Egypt, Tunisia, and Morocco. Jews had settled along the Upper Nile on the island of Elephantine in Egypt. These communities were augmented by subsequent arrivals of Jews after the destruction of the Second Temple in Jerusalem in 70 CE, when 30,000 Jewish slaves were settled throughout Carthage by the Roman emperor Titus.

Africa is identified in various Jewish sources in connection with Tarshish and Ophir. The Septuagint, and Jerome, who was taught by Jews, and very often the Aramaic Targum on the Prophets, identify the Biblical Tarshish with Carthage, which was the birthplace of a number of rabbis who are mentioned in the Talmud. Africa, in a broader sense, is clearly indicated where mention is made of the Ten Tribes who were driven into exile by the Assyrians and journeyed into Africa.  Connected with this is the idea that the river Sambation is in Africa. The Arabs, who also know the legend of the Banū Mūsā ("Sons of Moses"), agree with the Jews in placing their land in Africa.

As early as Roman times, Moroccan Jews had begun to travel inland in order to trade with groups of Berbers, most of whom were nomads who dwelt in remote areas of the Atlas Mountains. Jews lived side by side with Berbers, forging both economic and cultural ties; some Berbers even began to practice Judaism. In response, the Berbers' spirituality transformed Jewish rituals, painting it with a belief in the power of demons and saints. When the Muslims swept across the North of Africa, Jews and Berbers jointly defied them. Across the Atlas Mountains, the legendary Queen Kahina led a tribe of seventh-century Berbers, Jews, and other North African ethnic groups in battle against encroaching Islamic warriors.

In the 10th century, as the social and political environment in Baghdad became increasingly hostile to Jews, many Jewish traders who lived and worked there moved to the Maghreb, particularly to Tunisia. Over the following two to three centuries, a distinctive social group of traders who were active throughout the Mediterranean world became known as the Maghrebi, passing this term of identification on from father to son.

According to certain local Malian legends, an account in the Tarikh al-Sudan may have recorded the first Jewish presence in West Africa which coincided with the arrival of the first Zuwa ruler of Koukiya and his brother, who settled near the Niger River. He was only known as Za/Zuwa Alyaman (which means that "He comes from Yemen"). Some local legends state that Zuwa Alyaman was a member of one of the Jewish communities which were either transported or voluntarily moved from Yemen by the Ethiopians in the 6th century C.E. after the defeat of Dhu Nuwas. The Tarikh al-Sudan, states that there were 14 Zuwa rulers of Kukiya after Zuwa Alyaman before the rise of Islam in the region. There is debate on whether or not the Tarikh es-Soudan can be understood in this manner.

Trade and the establishment of communities 

Manuscript C of the Tarikh al-fattash describes a community called the Bani Israeel that in 1402 CE existed in Tindirma, possessed 333 wells, and had seven leaders:

Jabroot bin-Hashim
Thoelyaman bin-Abdel Hakim
Zeor bin-Salam
Abdel-latif bin-Solayman
Malik bin-Ayoob
Fadil bin-Mzar
Shaleb bin-Yousef

It is also stated that they had an army of 1500 men. Other sources say that other Jewish communities in the region were formed by migrations from Morocco, Egypt, and Portugal. When the Scottish explorer Mungo Park traveled through West Africa in the late 18th century he was informed by an Arab he met near Walata of there being many Arabic speaking Jews in Timbuktu whose prayers were similar to the Moors. Some communities are said to have been populated by certain Berber Jews like a group of Kal Tamasheq known as Iddao Ishaak that traveled from North Africa into West Africa for trade, as well as those escaping the Islamic invasions into North Africa.

Islamic era
In the 14th century, many Moors and Jews, who were fleeing persecution in Spain, migrated south to the Timbuktu area, which was part of the Songhai Empire at that time. Among them was the Kehath (Ka'ti) family, which was descended from Ismael Jan Kot Al-yahudi of Scheida, Morocco. The sons of this prominent family founded three villages which still exist near Timbuktu -- Kirshamba, Haybomo, and Kongougara. In 1492, Askia Mohammad I came to power in the previously tolerant region of Timbuktu and decreed that Jews must convert to Islam or leave; Judaism became illegal in Mali, as it did in Catholic Spain that same year. This was based on the advice of Muhammad al-Maghili.

As the historian Leo Africanus wrote in 1526:

"In Garura there were some very rich Jews. The intervention of the preacher (Muhammid al-Maghili) of Tlemcen set up the pillage of their goods, and most of them have been killed by the population. This event took place during the same year when the Jews had been expelled from Spain and Sicily by the Catholic King."

Leo Africanus further wrote:

"The king (Askia) is a declared enemy of the Jews. He will not allow any to live in the city. If he hears it said that a Berber merchant frequents them or does business with them, he confiscates his goods."

Jews of the Sahara 

There seems to be little doubt that Jews have largely been mixed with Berbers living in the Moroccan and Algerian Sahara. It is believed that some Berber clans may have been at one time Jews and according to another tradition they are descended from the Philistines driven out of Canaan. There is a tradition that Moses was buried in Tlemçen, and the presence of a large number of Jews in that part of Africa is attested to, not only by the many sacred places and shrines bearing Biblical names which are holy to Muslims as well as to Jews, but also by the presence there of a large number of Jewish sagas. L. Rinn says: "Certain Berber tribes were for a long time of the Jewish religion, especially in Amès; and to-day, even, we see among the Hanensha of Sukahras (Algeria) a semi-nomad tribe of Israelites devoted entirely to agriculture".
 
In addition, it may be noticed that Jews are to be found in the Berber "ksurs" (fortified villages) all along southern Morocco and in the adjacent Sahara. Thus, at Outat near Tafilalt there is a mellah with about 500 Jews; and at Figuig, a mellah with 100 Jews. Going farther south to Tuat, there is a large community of Jews in the oasis of Alhamada; and at Tamentit, a two weeks' journey from Tafilalt, the 6,000 or 8,000 inhabitants are said to be descendants of Jews converted to Islam. Even much farther to the west, in the province of Sus, there is Ogulmin with 3,000 inhabitants, of whom 100 are said to be Jews.

Daggatun connection
 
The Daggatuns were a nomadic tribe of Jewish origin living in the neighborhood of Tamentit, in the oasis of Tuat in the Algerian Sahara. An account of the Daggatun was first given by Rabbi Mordechai Abi Serour of Akka (Morocco), who in 1857 journeyed through the Sahara to Timbuctu, and whose account of his travels was published in the "Bulletin de la Société de Géographie". According to Rabbi Sarur, the Daggatun lived in tents and resembled the Berber Kel Tamesheq (Tuareg), among whom they live, in language, religion, and general customs. They are subject to the Tuaregs, who do not intermarry with them. Rabbi Sarur also states that their settlement in the Sahara dates from the end of the 7th century (Muslim chronology) when 'Abd al-Malik ascended the throne and conquered as far as Morocco. At Tamentit he tried to convert the inhabitants to Islam; and as the Jews offered great resistance he exiled them to the desert of Ajaj, as he did also the Tuaregs, who had only partially accepted Islam. Cut off from any connection with their brethren, these Jews in the Sahara gradually lost their Jewish practises and became nominally Muslims.

Other accounts place a group of "Arabs" driven to Ajaj as being identified with the Mechagra mentioned by Erwin von Bary, among whom a few Jews are said still to dwell there. Victor J. Horowitz also speaks of many free tribes in the desert regions who are Jews by origin, but who have gradually thrown off Jewish customs and have apparently accepted Islam. Among these tribes, he says, are the Daggatun, numbering several thousands and scattered over several oases in the Sahara, even as far as the River Dialiva (Djoliba?) or Niger. He says, also, that they are very warlike and in constant conflict with the Tuareg. According to Horowitz, the Mechagra mentioned above are also to be reckoned as one of these Jewish tribes. Horowitz had never been to Africa, but relied mainly on rumours spread in the European Jewish community.

Rabbi Mordechai Aby Serour and the last Timbuktu community

Rabbi Mordechai Abi Serour, with his brother Yitzhaq, came from Morocco in 1859 to be a trader in Timbuktu. At the time of Rabbi Serour's bold enterprise, direct trade relations with the interior of west Africa (then known to them as Sudan) were monopolized by Muslim merchants.  Non-Muslims were precluded from this trade because Arab merchants were determined to forestall encroachments upon their lucrative business.

As a man of cosmopolitan experience, he was well suited to be a merchant in that time and place.  He was clever, shrewd, articulate, audacious, and most important he knew Koranic law as well as most learned Muslims.  Throughout his travels to Timbuktu Rabbi Serour preferred to have most of his merchandise transported across the Sahara by bejaoui.  The term, bejaoui, refers to single or small groups of camels that carried travelers sometimes without merchandise or baggage, and were accompanied by indigenous guides.

As a Jew, he couldn't set up his trading business, so he appealed to the regional ruler, who at that time was a Fulani Emir, and negotiated dhimmi, or protected people status. Between 1860 and 1862 Rabbi Serour and his brother Yitzhaq were able to become successful and they became well known in the area.  After earning a small fortune, Rabbi Serour returned to Morocco in 1863.  He gave his father a large sum of money and talked his other brothers into joining him on his next venture to Timbuktu.  In 1864, the Jewish colony in Timbuktu had reason to rejoice since by the end of the year they had eleven adult male Jews in residence.  This was significant since it meant that they could form a minyan and establish a synagogue.  They were:
Rabbi Mordechai Aby Serour
Mordechai's brothers Esau, Avraham, and Yitzhaq
Esau's sons Aharon and David
Aharon's son Yitzhaq
Moussa (Mordechai's brother in law)
Moussa's son David
Rabbi Raphael
Shimon Ben-Yaaqov

Cape Verde

Manuel I in 1496, decided to exile thousands of Jews to São Tomé, Príncipe, and Cape Verde. The numbers expelled at this time were so great that the term "Portuguese" almost implied those of Jewish origin. Those who were not expelled were converted by force or executed. During the early 19th century, Jews also came to settle in Santo Antão where there are still traces of their influx in the name of the village of Sinagoga, located on the north coast between Ribeira Grande and Janela, and in the Jewish cemetery at the town of Ponta da Sol. A final chapter of Jewish history in Cape Verde took place in the 1850s when Moroccan Jews arrived, especially in Boa Vista and Maio for the hide trade.

Related texts
Records of the Jewish history of Mali can still be found in the Kati Andalusi library. Ismael Diadie Haidara, a historian from Timbuktu, possesses old Arabic and Hebrew texts among the city's historical records. He has also researched his own past and discovered that he is descended from the Moroccan Jewish traders of the Abana family. As he interviewed elders in the villages of his relatives, he has discovered that knowledge of the family's Jewish identity has been preserved, in secret, out of fear of persecution.

Recently there has come to light the personal library of the first Mahmoud Kati, which was handed down through his descendants and added to through at least the mid-17th century. This extraordinary "discovery" was made a by a young Malian historian, Ismaël Diadié Haïdara, a member of the Kati clan, and author of several books, including L'Espagne musulmane et l'Afrique subsaharienne (1997), and Les Juifs de Tombouctou (1999). Up to 1,700 out of an estimated 2,000 manuscripts in the library have been examined and evaluated by Abdul Kader Haïdara, the Timbuktu-based expert in Arabic manuscripts and guardian of the Mamma Haidara Memorial Library currently being rehabilitated through a grant from the Mellon Foundation.

The trading documents referred to three families in particular: the Kehath family (Ka'ti) that came from southern Morocco and converted with the rest of the population in 1492; the Cohen family descended from the Moroccan Jewish trader al-Hajj Abd al-Salam al Kuhin, who arrived in the Timbuktu area in the 18th century; and the Abana family, which came in the first half of the 19th century.

See also
History of the Jews in Africa
History of the Jews in Algeria
History of the Jews in Libya
History of the Jews in Morocco
History of the Jews in Portugal
History of the Jews in Spain
History of the Jews in Tunisia
History of the Jews under Muslim rule
House of Israel (Ghana)
Islamic–Jewish relations
Jewish diaspora
Jewish ethnic divisions
Jewish history
Lançados
Arab Jews
African-American Jews
Black Jews (disambiguation)
Beta Israel (Ethiopia)
Lemba people
Mizrahi Jews
 Negroland
Sephardi Jews
Trans-Saharan trade
Tribe of Judah

References

Further reading

General
Wars of the Jews: A Military History from Biblical to Modern Times, Hipporcrene Books, New York, 1990, by Monroe Rosenthal and Isaac Mozeson
Jewish Communities in Exotic Places, Jason Aronson Inc., Jerusalem, by Ken Blady
Jews In Africa: Ancient Black African Relations, Fact Paper 19-II, By Samuel Kurinsky
Hebrewisms of West Africa: From Nile to Niger With the Jews, The Dial Press, New York, 1931, by Joseph J. Williams
Jews of a Saharan Oasis: Elimination of the Tamantit Community, Markus Wiener Publishers, Princeton, New Jersey, 2006, by John Hunwick
 The Forgotten Diaspora: Jewish Communities In West Africa And The Making Of The Atlantic World. New York: Cambridge University Press, 2011, by Peter Mark and José da Silva Horta

Mali and Songhay
Jews in Africa: Part 1 The Berbers and the Jews, by Sam Timinsky (Hebrew History Federation)
"The Jews of Timbuktu", Washington Jewish Week, December 30, 1999, by Rick Gold
Les Juifs à Tombouctou, or Jews of Timbuktu, Recueil de sources écrites relatives au commerce juif à Tombouctou au XIXe siècle, Editions Donniya, Bamako, 1999 by Professor Ismael Diadie Haidara

Cape Verde and Guinea Coast
Jews in Cape Verde and on the Guinea Coast, Paper presented at the University of Massachusetts-Dartmouth, February 11, 1996, by Richard Lobban
 Jews of Cape Verde: A Brief History. Brooklyn, NY: Sepher-Hermon Press, 1997, by M. Mitchell Serels

External links
Resources>Jewish communities>Magreb The Jewish History Resource Center, Project of the Dinur Center for Research in Jewish History, The Hebrew University of Jerusalem

Timbuktu
Timbuktu: City of Legends, Joan Baxtor
Les manuscrits trouvés à Tombouctou, by Jean-Michel Djian

Northern Africa
Jews and Berbers, by Dr. Bruce Maddy-Weitzman

Cape Verde
Jews in Cape Verde and the Guinna Coast, by Dr. Richard Lobban

Bilad el-Sudan
History of the Gambia
West Africa
 
 
Social history of Burkina Faso
Jewish Cape Verdean history
Social history of Guinea
Social history of Mali
History of Mauritania
Social history of Niger
Social history of Nigeria
Social history of Senegal
Ghana Empire
Mali Empire
Songhai Empire